Mahuda Junction railway station is a railway station near NH 18 previously NH32, Mahuda Bazaar in Dhanbad district, Jharkhand state. It is operated by South Eastern Railway Adra division. Its code is MHQ. It is one of cleanest stations of Dhanbad despite its use for coal transportation. It is nearest to the Katras Baghmara and Dhanbad as it became the other substitute station for Dhanbad Junction. Ii is just 19 km from the area main junction. It is nearest to Bokaro Steel City. It is a good location both for Bokaro and Dhanbad. The important train is Nandan Kanan Express (ndls-puri). It is mainly in function for Washeries i.e. Mahuda, Moonidih .
The direct trains for major city like Ranchi, Rourkela, Nagpur, Kharagpur, Howrah, New Delhi, Kanpur, Fatehpur, Allahabad, Puri, Bhubaneswar, Cuttack, Surat, Bokaro, Adra, Gaya, Mughalsarai, Asansol, Malda

History
The Bengal Nagpur Railway extended its then mainline, the Nagpur–Asansol  line, to Netaji S.C.Bose Gomoh, on East Indian Railway's main line, in 1907. The Mohuda–Chandrapura branch line was opened in 1913.

Electrification
The Bhaga–Mahuda and Mahuda–Gomoh and Mahuda–Chandrapura sectors were electrified in 1985–88.

Passenger movement
Mahuda railway station serves around 70K passengers every month.

Trains stop
Super-Fast

12815/16 Puri–New Delhi Nandan Kanan Express

Mail/Express

18627/28 Ranchi–Howrah Intercity Express
15660/61 Kamakhya–Ranchi Express
13425/26 Surat-Malda Town Express
13304/05 Ranchi–Dhanbad Intercity Express
13403/04 Ranchi–Bhagalpur Vananchal Express
18605/06 Ranchi–Jaynagar Express
08627/28 Howrah–Ranchi Special Express

Passenger train
58013/14 Bokaro Steel City–Howrah Fast Passenger
58033/34 Bokaro Steel City–Ranchi Passenger (same boggie )
58603/04 Kharagpur–Gomoh Passenger
68079/80 Bhojudih–Chandrapura MEMU
68071/-- Adra–Khanudih MEMU
68074/-- Khanudih–Bhojudih MEMU
68017/18 Gomoh–Chakardharpur MEMU

References

External links
 Train time table
 http://www.onlinesanyog.weebly.com/
 http://www.dhanbad.nic.in/

Railway junction stations in Jharkhand
Railway stations in Dhanbad district
Adra railway division
Railway stations opened in 1913